District is one of four districts of the prefecture-level city of Yichun, Heilongjiang, China. The former Shangganling District was amalgamated with it in 2019. Its administrative centre is at Youhao  Subdistrict.

Administrative divisions 
Youhao District is divided into 7 subdistricts. 
7 subdistricts
 Shuangzihe Shequ, Xianfeng Shequ, Binshui Shequ, Qianjin Shequ, Xiangyang Shequ, Baoan Shequ, Tiexing Shequ

Notes and references 

Youhao